Local elections were held in Scotland in May 1970, as part of that years wider British local elections.

The municipal elections, held on 5 May, saw Labour making large gains from the Conservatives, SNP, and Liberals. In Glasgow, the Labour surge denied the Progressive-Conservative alliance of their recently won control. Across Scotland the election saw Labour gaining at the expense of the SNP, with Labour managing to win back voters who had crossed over to the SNP in previous years.

County elections were held the following week, on 13 May, and also saw Labour making further gains at the expense of the SNP.

Municipal Elections Aggregate Results

County Breakdown

References

 
1970
May 1970 events in the United Kingdom